Politicks: Collabs & B-Sides is a compilation album by Oakland Hip hop duo Zion I, released in 2004 on the duo's own Live Up Records imprint. The album is compiled of various collaborative tracks and single B-sides.

Track listing

Zion I albums
B-side compilation albums
2004 compilation albums